Kakaban island is part of the Derawan Islands, East Kalimantan, Indonesia.

Its limestone cliffs are covered with dense jungle right down to the water's edge.

The most distinctive feature is the huge brackish water lake in the middle of the island, in the local dialect Kakaban means "hug" as the island hugs the lake from the surrounding seawater.

Jellyfish Lake

In the middle of this island is a mangrove-fringed lake, slightly above sea level, where thousands of jellyfish live, making it interesting for diving. The jellyfish consist of four different species which do not have the ability to harm humans with their stinging cells. They are Aurelia aurita with a transparent body, Tripedalia cystophora which is fingertip size, Mastigias papua is like a green-brown bulb, and Cassiopea ornata which is an upside-down jellyfish with upright tentacles. Although they cannot sting humans, they still have poison and can sting their prey. Similar lakes exist in the Philippines (Siargao) Palau, with Jellyfish Lake being the best known.

The lake has warm brackish water and the bottom is covered with marine green algae. There are other animals, including sea cucumbers, gobies, sea anemones, tunicates, crustaceans, nudibranchs, orange purple clams and yellow clams on the branches, and snakes.

Kakaban was probably uplifted during the Holocene era and seawater was trapped, forming a landlocked marine lake. The water is now a mixture of saltwater and fresh water from rain.

Barracuda Point
This is a steep wall, where the current brings large pelagics like whitetip sharks, leopard sharks, jack, tuna, snapper and barracuda. Currents can be fierce with down currents.

Blue Light Cave
The name of the cave comes from the blue light of the sea which is seen from the cavern.

References

Derawan Islands
Landforms of East Kalimantan
Islands of Kalimantan
Uninhabited islands of Indonesia